The Hinckley Homestead is a historic house located in the Marstons Mills area of Barnstable, Massachusetts.

Description and history 
The -story Cape house was probably built c. 1750, although local historians assert it may have been built earlier. Its likely builder was Edmund Hinckley, grandson of early settler Samuel Hinckley. It has remained in the hands of his descendants; many of its exterior and interior Georgian details have been preserved.

The house was listed on the National Register of Historic Places on September 18, 1987.

See also
National Register of Historic Places listings in Barnstable County, Massachusetts

References

Houses in Barnstable, Massachusetts
National Register of Historic Places in Barnstable, Massachusetts
Houses on the National Register of Historic Places in Barnstable County, Massachusetts
Houses completed in 1750
Georgian architecture in Massachusetts